The Cosco Tower is an office tower in the Grand Millennium Plaza in western Hong Kong Island in Hong Kong. The tower has a total structural height of 228 m (748 ft). Construction of the Cosco Tower was completed in 1998. There are 56 floors, 53 of which are above ground.

The building was developed by the Land Development Corporation.

Notable tenants
 COSCO
 COSCO Shipping International
 Urban Renewal Authority

See also

 List of tallest buildings
 List of tallest buildings in Hong Kong

References

Skyscraper office buildings in Hong Kong
Office buildings completed in 1998
COSCO Shipping